Charles Winton Heggie (26 September 1862 – 15 July 1925) was a Scottish footballer who played for Rangers, St Bernard's and the Scotland national team. He is one of just two players to have scored four goals in their only Scotland appearance.

Career
Heggie began his career at Govan based club Ailsa FC before joining Rangers in 1882. At Rangers he initially played as a defender but moved to a forward position for much of the 1883–84 season and finished the season as the club's top scorer with 13 goals in 30 matches. In these early years of football, with the exception of the Scottish Cup, Rangers only contested friendly matches but Heggie helped Rangers reach the Cup semi-finals, scoring in a 5–1 win against Cambuslang in the quarter-finals.

The following season, he only played 7 times for Rangers, scoring 5 goals, but was a regular again in 1885–86 with 29 goals in 31 games. His only Scotland appearance was against Ireland on 20 March 1886 at Ballynafeigh Park, Belfast. Scotland won the match 7–2 and Heggie scored four of the Scotland goals. Heggie holds the distinction of being one of just two players in Scottish football history to have scored 4 goals in their only international cap; two years later William Dickson would repeat the feat, again against Ireland.

The Scottish Umpire and Cycling Mercury noted in October 1886 that:

Unsurprisingly perhaps, the 1886–87 season proved to be his last at Rangers and he played 8 matches, scoring 3 times.  After his spell with Rangers he moved to St. Bernard's in January 1887. This proved to be his final club; however he remained within football as a referee. Heggie later emigrated to Western Australia, where he died in 1925.

See also
 List of Scotland national football team hat-tricks

References

External links

1862 births
1925 deaths
Scottish footballers
Scotland international footballers
Rangers F.C. players
Scottish football referees
St Bernard's F.C. players
Association football forwards
Scottish emigrants to Australia